Popów-Parcela  is a settlement in the administrative district of Gmina Popów, within Kłobuck County, Silesian Voivodeship, in southern Poland.

References

Villages in Kłobuck County